The Wardlaw–Smith House (also known as the Smith Mansion) is a U.S. historic building in Madison, Florida. It is located at 103 North Washington Street. On June 30, 1972, it was added to the U.S. National Register of Historic Places. Donated in 1988 to North Florida Community College in 1988; the college uses it as a conference center.

References

External links
Wardlaw–Smith–Goza Conference Center

Houses on the National Register of Historic Places in Florida
Houses in Madison County, Florida
Historic American Buildings Survey in Florida
National Register of Historic Places in Madison County, Florida
1860s establishments in Florida